Judith Wiesner (née Pölzl; born 2 March 1966) is a former professional tennis player from Austria. During her career, she won five top-level singles titles and three tour doubles titles. Her career high rankings were world No. 12 in singles (in 1997), and No. 29 in doubles (in 1989). In 1996, Wiesner was a quarterfinalist at both Wimbledon and the US Open.

Fed Cup
Wiesner played her first match for the Austria Federation Cup team in 1983, and her last match in the Fed Cup in 1997. All together, she played in 14 different years, which is the most played by any player for Austria. She also holds the Austrian Fed Cup records for the most wins, the most singles wins, the most doubles wins jointly with Barbara Schett, and the most ties played.

Post-tennis
Initially, Wiesner turned her hand to golf, achieving a handicap of 2. She was the team captain of Austria's Fed Cup team for 2001. She married Roland Floimair in 2001. From 1999 until 2004 she was a member of the Salzburg city council for the Austrian People's Party (ÖVP). She is also the tournament ambassador for the Gastein Ladies event.

WTA Tour finals

Singles: 12 (5–7)

Doubles: 9 (3–6)

ITF Circuit finals

Singles (3–2)

Doubles (1–1)

Grand Slam singles performance timeline

Best Grand Slam results details

References

External links 
 
 
 

1966 births
Living people
Austrian female tennis players
People from Hallein
Olympic tennis players of Austria
Tennis players at the 1992 Summer Olympics
Hopman Cup competitors
Sportspeople from Salzburg (state)